Arnan or Ernan may refer to:
 Arnan, East Azerbaijan
 Arnan, Kurdistan
 Ernan, Yazd
 Ernan Rural District, in Yazd Province